Manhattan Mall is an inactive indoor shopping mall at 33rd Street and Sixth Avenue in Midtown Manhattan, New York City.  There are entrances to the New York City Subway's  station and the PATH's  station on the second basement level.  

The mall replaced the former flagship store of the Gimbels department store chain, which operated from 1910 to 1986.  It opened in 1989 as a shopping center called A&S Plaza and was rebranded Manhattan Mall in 1995.  Stern's department store occupied the anchor store space from 1995–2001.  The upper floors were converted into office space in the 2000s decade, with the mall focusing on the first, second, and two basement levels instead.  JCPenney operated the large anchor store from 2007 to 2020.

The coronavirus pandemic hit the mall hard in 2020, with most of the remaining stores departing and the location relegated to being a dead mall.  As of mid-2022, the mall area functions primarily as an expanded lobby for the offices of 100 West 33rd Street, allowing office tenants direct access from Sixth Avenue as well as the subway station. Lenscrafters is the only retail store remaining inside the mall.

History
The structure was originally built as the flagship of the Gimbels department store chain. It was designed by famed architect Daniel Burnham and opened on September 29, 1910. The store was located in the cluster of large department stores that surrounded Herald Square, in Midtown Manhattan. It offered  of selling space. A major selling point was its many doors leading to the Herald Square New York City Subway station. On the other hand, by the time Gimbels closed in 1986, the store had the highest rate of "shrinkage", or shoplifting losses, in the world. Doors also opened to a pedestrian passage under 33rd Street, connecting Penn Station to the 34th Street (New York City Subway) and 33rd Street (PATH) stations.  This Gimbels Passageway was closed in the 1990s for security reasons during a period of high crime. 

Gimbels closed in 1986. After a renovation, the structure reopened in 1989 as A&S Plaza, anchored by an A&S department store. The mall was originally 13 stories high, but difficult access to upper floors made the whole mall a financial failure.

A&S closed in 1995 and the anchor store became Stern's after Federated Department Stores took acquisition of the brand. The structure was renamed Manhattan Mall, due to the closure of A&S. Stern's closed in 2001, after Federated Department Stores decided to discontinue the brand. Unlike other Stern's stores, the Manhattan Mall location was not converted to a Macy's. Instead, the anchor store was divided into smaller spaces, including a Steve & Barry's and a relocated food court. The upper ten levels were converted to office space shortly after the closure of Stern's.

Venture bought the building in 1999 for $135 million and sold it to Vornado Realty Trust in 2006 for $689 million. 

On April 18, 2007, JCPenney announced that it would open a  anchor store on the lower levels of the mall. It was the first JCPenney store in Manhattan. The mall's food court, which contained the only Arby's restaurant in Manhattan at the time, along with retailers such as Steve & Barry's, Brookstone and Nine West were closed in 2008 to make way for the new store. The store officially opened on July 31, 2009. On July 7, 2020, JCPenney closed permanently as part of a plan to close 151 stores nationwide. As of November 2021, clothing store Aeropostale moved into the former Express in the front of the mall having an external entrance, leaving LensCrafters as the last store in the mall.  The mall has closed to foot traffic and LensCrafters is only accessible by appointment.

Gallery

References

External links
 
 the Manhattan Mall at New York Architecture Images and Notes

Sixth Avenue
Shopping malls in New York City
Commercial buildings in Manhattan
Shopping malls established in 1989
Midtown Manhattan
1989 establishments in New York City